Bahramjerd (also Romanized as Bahrāmjerd; also known as Bahrāmjird) is a village in Negar Rural District, in the Central District of Bardsir County, Kerman Province, Iran. At the 2006 census, its population was 219, in 70 families.

References 

Populated places in Bardsir County